26 Pashons - Coptic calendar - 28 Pashons

Fixed commemorations
All fixed commemorations below are observed on 27 Pashons (4 June) by the Coptic Orthodox Church.

Saints
 Pope John II of Alexandria (232 A.M.), (516 A.D.)
 Saint Lazarus

References
Coptic Synexarion

Days of the Coptic calendar